The Dukes is a 2007 comedy-drama film about a group of has-been musicians who attempt a bank heist. The film was directed by Robert Davi, and stars Chazz Palminteri, Robert Davi, Peter Bogdanovich, Frank D'Amico and Elya Baskin.

Cast
 Chazz Palminteri as George
 Robert Davi as Danny
 Peter Bogdanovich as Lou
 Frank D'Amico as Armond
 Elya Baskin as Murph
 Miriam Margolyes as Aunt Vee
 Melora Hardin as Diane
 Bruce Weltz as Toulio 
 Eloise DeJoria as Katherine
 Joseph Campanella as Giovanni Zorro 
 Dominic Scott Kay as Brion
 Elaine Hendrix as Stephanie
 Alphonse Mouzon as Ray
 Joyce Westergarrd as Suzette
 John Prosky as Brad

External links
 
 
Variety review

2007 comedy-drama films
American comedy-drama films
2000s English-language films
2000s American films